Seien Kin (7 January 1914 – 16 July 1992) was a Japanese speed skater. He competed in three events at the 1936 Winter Olympics.

References

1914 births
1992 deaths
Japanese male speed skaters
Olympic speed skaters of Japan
Speed skaters at the 1936 Winter Olympics
Sportspeople from Pyongyang
20th-century Japanese people